"Breakeven", also titled "Breakeven (Falling to Pieces)" is a song by the Irish pop rock band the Script. It was released on 24 November 2008 as the third single from their first album, The Script (2008). The song peaked at number 10 in Ireland, number 21 in the United Kingdom, number 12 in the United States Billboard Hot 100 and number 3 in Australia.

Music video
The music video premiered on BBC Radio 1's website on 29 September 2008. It was recorded at the Great South Wall in Dublin. Before recording began, the Dublin radio station FM104 had a competition for a listener to appear in the music video. The music video shows clips of the band's home city of Dublin, Ireland and the band performing. 

The video almost created minor controversy when Danny O'Donoghue's ex-girlfriend was supposed to be cast as an extra but this was avoided when the producers chose a different girl. The video was number 2 on the 2010 VH1's Top 40 Videos of the Year.

Live performances
The band performed "Breakeven" on an episode of The Paul O'Grady Show which was shown on 30 October 2008. On 14 October 2009, they performed the song on The Ellen DeGeneres Show in the United States.

Track listing
 CD single
 "Breakeven" - 4:21
 "None the Wiser" (Guardian Demo)

 German CD single
 "Breakeven" - 4:21
 "Lose Yourself" (Radio 1 Live Lounge Session)

 German Maxi single
 "Breakeven" - 4:21
 "None the Wiser" (Guardian Demo)
 "Lose Yourself" (Radio 1 Live Lounge Session)
 "Breakeven" (Music Video) - 4:15

Charts

Weekly charts

Year-end charts

All-time charts

Certifications

Cover versions
On 19 November 2012, Samantha Jade performed "Breakeven" during The X Factor Australia series four grand final performance show. Her performance of the song debuted at number 87 on the Australian ARIA Singles Chart. On 25 August 2013, Jade and The X Factor Indonesia series one runner-up Novita Dewi released a cover version of "Breakeven" on the iTunes Store through Sony Music Australia.

Canadian singer Tate McRae performed a cover of the song during her North American tour in March–April 2022.

References

See also
List of Billboard Adult Contemporary number ones of 2010

2008 singles
2013 singles
The Script songs
Rock ballads
2008 songs
Songs written by Andrew Frampton (songwriter)
Songs written by Steve Kipner
Songs written by Danny O'Donoghue
Songs written by Mark Sheehan
Songs containing the I–V-vi-IV progression
Sony Music singles